François de Casembroot (Liège, 26 July 1817 – The Hague, 14 April 1895) was an officer of the Royal Netherlands Navy.

Casembroot was named Commander of the 16-gun warship Medusa, which patrolled the Japanese coast from 1862 to 1864. On July 11, 1863, the ship was attacked in the Strait of Shimonoseki by the ships and the batteries of the daimyō of Chōshū, Mōri Takachika, who was following an Imperial "Order to expel barbarians" (攘夷実行の勅命 – Jōi jikkō no chokumei). Casembroot managed to respond and escape, although with significant damage. Four sailors were killed in action, and 5 other were wounded.

The following year, in September 1864, Casembroot participated to the Allied retaliations against Chōshū, again on the Medusa, in the Bombardment of Shimonoseki.

Back in the Netherlands, Casembroot was complimented for his actions in Japan, was knighted and was decorated together with his men.

In 1865, Casembroot wrote an account of his adventures in Japan, entitled De medusa in wateren van Japan ("The Medusa in the waters of Japan").

Notes

References
 Polak, Christian. (2001). Soie et lumières: L'âge d'or des échanges franco-japonais (des origines aux années 1950). Tokyo: Chambre de Commerce et d'Industrie Française du Japon, Hachette Fujin Gahōsha (アシェット婦人画報社).
 __. (2002). 絹と光: 知られざる日仏交流100年の歴史 (江戶時代-1950年代) Kinu to hikariō: shirarezaru Nichi-Futsu kōryū 100-nen no rekishi (Edo jidai-1950-nendai). Tokyo: Ashetto Fujin Gahōsha, 2002. ;

External links

Account of the battle of Shimonoseki
W.L. Clowes on the Anglo-Japanese hostilities of 1863 - 1864

1817 births
1895 deaths
Dutch sailors
Grand Officers of the Order of Orange-Nassau
Knights Third Class of the Military Order of William
Military personnel from Liège
Politicians from Liège
Members of the House of Representatives (Netherlands)